The Bombay Scottish School, Mahim (BSS or BSS Mahim), popularly known as Scottish, is a private, Christian co-educational day school located at Mahim West in Mumbai, India. The institution was established in 1847 by Scottish Christian missionaries under the name Scottish Female Orphanage. Bombay Scottish School, Powai is an affiliate of this institution.

The school caters to pupils from kindergarten up to class 12 and the medium of instruction is English. The school is affiliated with the Council for the Indian School Certificate Examinations, New Delhi, which conducts the ICSE examinations at the close of class 10 and the ISC examinations at the close of class 12. The school has been among the top 10 schools in India for the past few decades.

History
The institution was founded in 1847 at Byculla in Bombay, British India by a small group of Scottish missionaries as the Scottish Female Orphanage. The orphanage was set up to educate the daughters of Scottish Presbyterian soldiers and Indian navy seamen. The success of the Scottish Female Orphanage led to the establishment of a similar institution for boys known as the Orphanage for the Sons of Presbyterians in 1857. In 1859, the Scottish Female Orphanage and the Orphanage for the Sons of Presbyterians were merged to form The Bombay Presbyterian Male and Female Orphanage. In 1863, the name of the institution was altered to the Bombay Scottish Orphanage. On 18 February 1867, the first general meeting of subscribers to the Bombay Scottish Orphanage Trust was held.
The institution acquired a large plot of land adjacent to the Mahim Bay. Here a boarding school was built to impart education on the model of British schools. The school building was designed by D. E. Gostling and J. Morris and sanctioned by the Government of Bombay on 15 July 1875. The construction of the school building was commenced on 8 December 1875 by Sir Philip Edmond Wodehouse, then Governor and President in Council. The construction of the Bombay Scottish Orphanage was completed on 28 February 1878 at a cost of  84,015. The orphanage was opened by Sir Richard Temple Bart, then Governor and President in Council on 13 April 1878. The children were shifted from Byculla to their new accommodation in the boarding school at Mahim. The orphanage relied on the public to a considerable extent for monetary funds.

During the early days of the school, its student strength was around 30. For many decades the student strength did not exceed 55 to 60. As classes were added and the quality of education improved, the orphanage was raised to the level of a high school and was renamed The Bombay Scottish Orphanage High School.

When the orphanage was shut down and its 11th and 12th classes discontinued, its name was changed to The Bombay Scottish School. In 1935, the number of students reached 100. The institution, which was intended to cater solely to the requirements of Scottish children, opened its doors to the children of English and European descent. Today, the school is open to children from all communities.

The school has a sister concern in Powai, Mumbai which was established in 1997.

Campus site and layout
The school is situated on Veer Savarkar Marg (formerly Cadell Road), overlooking the Mahim Bay. The P. D. Hinduja National Hospital and Medical Research Centre is located opposite the school.

The school buildings are divided into the Heritage Block (formerly Middle Block), North Block, East Block, and South Block. The East Block is the newest addition to the school, joint to the North Block. It opened in June 2009. The school has a playground, two basketball courts, and two separate play-areas for younger students. Adjacent to the playground is a large Banyan tree which is over 150 years old. There are three halls in the campus – the MacKay Hall, the Gamaliel Hall and the Saint Andrew's Hall.

Heritage Block
The Heritage Block was the first building of the institution. It was a one-storeyed edifice built in colonial style and made of black granite using Ashlar masonry. The Heritage Block also includes the MacKay Hall, the School Library, and the principal's residence. The MacKay Hall was originally a chapel that was later renamed after Adam MacKay, the last Scottish principal of the school. Today, MacKay Hall is used as a multimedia theatre, singing room, and meeting hall. All Kindergarten and some senior school classrooms are located in the heritage block

North Block
The ground floor of the North Block was constructed in 1937. Subsequently, two more floors were added to the North Block. The science laboratories, Art Room, and Senior School classrooms are located in the North Block. It is adjacent to the East Block

South Block
The South Block was constructed in 1967 and consists of three floors, excluding the ground floor. The large Gamaliel Hall is located on the ground floor of the South Block and is named after Lazarus Gamaliel, the first Indian principal of the school. The Gamaliel Hall is used for Morning Assembly, inter-house competitions, and board examinations. The Gamaliel Hall includes a grand piano which is over a century old. The South Block includes the Middle School classes and the computer laboratories.

East Block
Construction of the East Block commenced in late 2007 and was completed in early 2009. It was opened for use before the start of the new academic year, 2009–10. It was constructed adjacent to the North Block, where common walls were broken to provide passageways between the two buildings. As it was constructed on the ground that served as the main basketball court, the ground floor, 1st, and 2nd floors were merged to provide a new basketball court, which is open to the playground on two sides. The 3rd, 4th, and 5th floors are used as classrooms. A small, new library is on the 5th floor for use by class 11 and 12.

Admissions and curriculum

Curriculum
The school follows the Indian Certificate of Secondary Education (ICSE) syllabus prescribed by the Council for the Indian School Certificate Examinations, New Delhi. English is the medium of instruction. Hindi and French are taught as second languages. English and Hindi are taught from class 1. Marathi, the regional language is taught as a third language and is compulsory from class 1 up to class 7.

The style of teaching ranges from an informal type at the pre-school level to a semi-formal type in early primary school and moves on to a progressively more formal type in the late primary, middle, and secondary school levels. No formal homework is assigned in the lower primary levels and limited homework is assigned in the higher levels.

The academic year which commences in June and concludes in April consists of two terms. The first term is from June till November and the second term is from November till April. Tests are conducted periodically and examinations are held at the end of every term. The courses of studies extend from kindergarten to class 10, at the end of which students appear for the ICSE Examinations. The school's students have consistently performed well at the ICSE examinations and the school has maintained a 100% pass-rate.

Candidates for the ICSE examination need to finish satisfactorily courses in a third language (Marathi), Art and Craft, Physical Education, Moral Education, Socially Useful Productive Work (SUPW). These are evaluated internally by the school and the results contribute towards the award of the ICSE pass certificate. Project work is assessed from class 1 to class 10. Field trips, camps and social service visits are organised regularly.

School life

School flag and shield
The school flag features the white Cross of St. Andrew against a blue background. St. Andrew is the patron saint of Scotland. The flag is flown during ceremonial occasions. The school shield represents the Cross of St. Andrew. The white Crux decussata (cross) quarters the shield into four segments each representing a house colour denoted by the Fleur-de-lis, the Castle, the Lion and the Palm tree.

Motto, school song and school hymn
The school's motto is 'Perseverantia et fide in Deo', Latin for 'Perseverance and faith in God'. The school song is generally sung during the morning assembly and on special occasions. 'Courage Brother, Do Not Stumble' is the official school hymn. Psalm 23 is also rendered at every school function.

House system
The boys' house names are named after Scottish Clans and the girls' are named after British Queens.

Culture
Bombay Scottish imparts Christian values to its students. A Christmas concert is held every December and is a three-day event. Inter-house competitions are held in cultural activities such as drama and elocution and sports such as football, throw ball, and basketball. An annual survey conducted by the Outlook magazine in 2002 ranked the school at top position in the Mumbai region.

Governance
The school is managed by a Managing Committee. The current principal, Sunita George, replaced the previous incumbent, Molly Paul. A Chief Academic Coordinator manages the curricular activities of the school. The present Chief Academic Coordinator is Sarah Thomas, who replaced Molly Paul at the end of the 2013–14-year, when she became principal. Molly Paul replaced Monica Bose in 2006. In addition, there are academic coordinators at the junior school, middle school, and senior school levels.

Notable Events
 The Frank Anthony Memorial All-India Inter-school Debate: The school was the venue for the first round of The Frank Anthony Memorial All-India Inter-School Debate in 2014.
 Scottish Model United Nations: The school hosts the Scottish Model United Nations (SMUN) annually.

Superintendents and principals
The institution has had fourteen heads. The Gamaliel Hall and the MacKay Hall are named after notable principals Lazarus Gamaliel and Adam MacKay. After the completion of his tenure at Mahim, Mark David went on to become the first principal of the sister school, Bombay Scottish School, Powai.The school's principals include:

Controversies
On 11 May 2008, unidentified Shiv Sena activists targeted the name plate of the school and blackened the word 'Bombay' written on one of the school gates with tar and replaced it with 'Mumbai'. The police was notified of the incident and a case was registered. Ironically, Shiv Sena chief, Uddhav Thackeray's sons Aditya and Tejas as well as Raj Thackeray's daughter Urvashi have all studied at Bombay Scottish School.

Notable alumni

Arts and entertainment
 Aamir Khan – Bollywood actor
 Abhishek Bachchan – Bollywood actor
 Aditya Bhattacharya – Indian film director and screenwriter
 Aditya Chopra (1987) – Indian film director, screenwriter and producer
 Amrita Puri - Indian Bollywood Actress and daughter of Adiya Puri, managing director of HDFC Bank
 Arjun Bijlani – Indian television actor
 Aziz Mirza – Bollywood director
 Dharmesh Darshan – Bollywood film director and screenwriter
 Ekta Kapoor (1991) – Indian television producer
 Hrithik Roshan (1990) – Bollywood actor
 Imran Khan – Bollywood actor
 John Abraham (1988) – Bollywood actor and former model
 Lesle Lewis – composer, best known for his work as part of Colonial Cousins
 Lucky Ali (1974) – Indian singer songwriter, composer and actor
 Mansoor Khan – movie director
 Rahul Sharma – Musician of Hindustani classical music
 Ranbir Kapoor (1998) – Bollywood actor
 Ranjit Hoskote (1984) – Indian poet, art critic, cultural theorist and independent curator
 Rishi Vohra (1990) - Author
Sanjit Narwekar (1967) - Film historian and Documentary filmmaker
 Sameera Reddy - Bollywood actress
 Sushma Reddy – model, VJ and screenwriter
 Tusshar Kapoor – Bollywood actor
 Uday Chopra (1989) – Bollywood actor
 Vikas Bhalla – Indian television and movie actor and singer
Mishkat Varma - Indian Television Actor

Politics
 Aditya Thackeray (2006) – son of Uddhav Thackeray and leader of Yuva Sena, Minister (Environment and climate, Tourism, Protocol), Government of Maharashtra
 Praniti Shinde (1996) – Politics

Sports
 Rohan Gavaskar (1992) – Indian cricketer
Jehan Daruvala (2015) – Current Formula 2 driver
Bhavik Gandhi (1989)  - Sailor and adventurer

Other
 Neerja Bhanot – Senior Flight Purser with Pan Am Airways, awarded the Ashoka Chakra posthumously.
 Manavendra Singh Gohil – LGBT rights activist, belongs to the royal family of the former princely state of Rajpipla, India.
 Vikram Limaye - CEO of National Stock Exchange
 Lalit Surajmal Kanodia - Founder of Datamatics

See also

 List of schools in Mumbai
List of the oldest schools in the world

References

External links

Schools in Colonial India
Educational institutions established in 1847
1847 establishments in British India
Private schools in Mumbai